This is an incomplete list of French ambassadors to the United Kingdom of Great Britain and Ireland and the United Kingdom of Great Britain and Northern Ireland, operating from the Embassy of France, London:
 1801–02 : Louis-Guillaume Otto, comte de Mosloy (Chargé d'affaires)
 1803–04 : General Antoine Andréossy later comte de l'Empire
Napoleonic Wars (1803–1814)

 1814–1815 : Louis, duc de La Chastre
 1815–1819 : René-Eustache, marquis d'Osmond
 1819–1819 : Victor de Faÿ, marquis de La Tour-Maubourg
 1820–1821 : Élie, duc Decazes & de Glücksbierg
 1821–1821 : Antoine, duc de Gramont
 1822–1823 : François-Auguste-René, vicomte de Chateaubriand
 1823–1828 : Jules, prince de Polignac
 1828–1830 : Anne-Adrien-Pierre de Montmorency, duc de Laval
 1830–1834 : Charles, prince de Talleyrand
 1830–1832 : Charles-Joseph Bresson, chevalier later comte de l'Empire (First Secretary, on behalf of Talleyrand)
 1835–1840 : Horace-François-Bastien Sébastiani, comte de La Porta
 1840–1841 : Ministre François Guizot
 1841–1847 : Louis de Beaupoil, comte de Saint-Aulaire
 1847–1848 : Victor, duc de Broglie
 1848–1848 : Gustave-Auguste Bonnin de La Bonninière, comte de Beaumont
 1848–1851 : Ministre Édouard Drouyn de Lhuys
 1851–1855 : Alexandre-Florian-Joseph Colonna, comte Walewski
 1855–1858 : Jean-Gilbert-Victor Fialin, duc de Persigny 
 1858–1859 : Aimable-Jean-Jacques Pélissier, duc de Malakoff 
 1859–1860 : Jean-Gilbert-Victor Fialin, duc de Persigny 
 1860–1862 : Charles-Joseph, comte de Flahaut 
 1862–1863 : Jean-Baptiste-Louis, baron Gros
 1863–1869 : Henri, prince de La Tour d'Auvergne
 1869–1870 : Charles, marquis de La Valette
 1871–1872 : Philippe-Ferdinand-Auguste de Rohan-Chabot, comte de Jarnac
 1872–1873 : Albert, duc de Broglie
 1873–1873 : Louis-Charles-Élie-Amanieu, duc Decazes & de Glücksbierg 
 1873–1874 : Sosthène, vicomte de La Rochefoucauld later duc de Doudeauville
 1875–1879 : Georges, marquis d'Harcourt
 1879–1880 : Amiral Louis-Pierre-Alexis de Pothuau
 1880–1880 : Ministre Léon Say 
 1880–1882 : Sénateur Paul-Armand Challemel-Lacour 
 1883–1893 : Dr. William Henry Waddington (Prime Minister of France, 1879) 
 1894–1898 : Alphonse Chodron, baron de Courcel
 1898–1920 : Paul Cambon
 1920–1924 : Auguste-Félix-Charles de Beaupoil, comte de Saint-Aulaire 
 1924–1933 : Aimé-Benjamin de Fleuriau, comte de Bellevue
 1933–1940 : Charles, baron Corbin

Second World War (1940–1944)
 1944–1955 : René Massigli
 1955–1962 : Chevalier Jean Chauvel
 1962–1972 : Geoffroy Chodron, baron de Courcel
 1972–1977 : Jacques Delarüe-Caron de Beaumarchais
 1977–1981 : Jean Sauvagnargues
 1981–1984 : Emmanuel Jacquin de Margerie
 1984–1986 : Jacques Viot
 1986–1990 : Luc, vicomte de La Barre de Nanteuil
 1990–1993 : Bernard Dorin
 1993–1998 : Jean Guéguinou
 1998–2002 : Daniel Bernard
 2002–2007 : Gérard Errera
 2007–2011 : Maurice Gourdault-Montagne
 2011–2014 : Bernard Émié
 2014–2017 : Sylvie Bermann
 2017–2019 : Jean-Pierre Jouyet
 2019–2022 : Catherine Colonna
 2022- : Hélène Tréheux-Duchêne

See also
French Embassy in London
List of ambassadors of France to the Kingdom of Great Britain
List of ambassadors of France to England

References

External links
 Dictionnaire de la Noblesse
 Liste des Ambassadeurs, Envoyés, Ministres et autres Agents politiques de la Cour de La France. François-Marie Guérard, Paris 1833

United Kingdom
France